Conor O'Donnell may refer to:

 Conor O'Donnell (Carndonagh footballer), Donegal Gaelic footballer
 Conor O'Donnell (St Eunan's footballer), Donegal Gaelic footballer